Prosthecobacter is a genus of bacteria from the phylum Verrucomicrobiota with a distinctive characteristic; the presence of tubulin-like genes. 
Tubulins, which are components of the microtubule, have never been observed in Gracilicutes before.

Tubulin was long thought to be specific to eukaryotes. More recently, however, several prokaryotic proteins have been shown to be related to tubulin.

Most bacteria have a homologous structure, FtsZ. Prosthecobacter are the exception to this, containing genes that have higher sequence homology to eukaryotic tubulin than FtsZ.

These genes are called bacterial tubulin a (BtubA) and bacterial tubulin b (BtubB). The properties are not exactly same. However, surface loops and microtubules are extremely similar.

Phylogeny
The currently accepted taxonomy is based on the List of Prokaryotic names with Standing in Nomenclature (LPSN) and National Center for Biotechnology Information (NCBI)

See also
 List of bacterial orders
 List of bacteria genera

References

Bacteria genera
Verrucomicrobiota